Formed in 1948, the National Wrestling Alliance (NWA) was the largest governing body in professional wrestling. Under the control of the NWA Board of Directors (consisting of various prominent, regional promoters), the organization oversaw the NWA's national territory system which recognized one world champion, participated in talent exchanges, and collectively protected the territorial integrity of member promotions. Unlike independent promotions, territories collaborate and recognize other member promotions. In 1993, the territories were reorganized following the withdrawal of World Championship Wrestling (WCW) and New Japan Pro-Wrestling (NJPW). As other territories left the organization, the NWA would discontinue its memberships in August 2012. 

The following is a list of all past NWA-affiliated promotions and/or territories.

Former NWA-affiliated promotions and/or territories
The following promotions joined the NWA between its founding in 1948 and before the organization was acquired by Lightning One in October 2017. 

† indicates a founding member of the NWA

Timeline, 1948–1993

References

External links
 Official NWA website
 Official NWA YouTube channel
 Official NWA Facebook page

 
National Wrestling Alliance territories